This is a list of hospitals in Saudi Arabia.  There are a total of 504 hospitals as of 2020. 287 of these hospitals are under the direction of the Ministry of Health. Another 50 hospitals are run by other governmental organizations. The remaining 167 hospitals are privately operated.

Mecca

King Abdullah Medical City (KAMC) - Mecca
The estimated $1.4bn King Abdullah Medical City (KAMC) is the third referral specialist medical city in the country after King Fahd Medical City in Riyadh and King Fahd Specialist Hospital in Dammam. The area of the KAMC is 800,000m². The accommodation capacity of the five-storey building is 1,500 beds, of which 500 have been allotted to the specialist referral hospital. Al Rajhi Holding Group, China State, Construction, El Seif and Saudi Binladin Group have all entered the prequalification stage. The scope of work includes a cardiac centre (150 beds), a centre for specialised surgery and organ transplantation (100 beds), and a centre for cancer treatment and surgical oncology (200 beds). The project's consultants are RTKL/Saudi Diyar Consultants 

 Al-Adwani General Hospital - Mecca
 Abeer Medical Center - Mecca
 Saudi National Hospital Managed by Abeer Medical group - Mecca ( First private hospital in KSA)
 AL-Noor Specialized Hospital - Mecca
 Shifa Albaraka Polyclinic- Mecca

Madinah

 Abeer Medical center - Medina  
 King Abdulaziz Hospital - Medina
 King Fahd Hospital - Medina
 Al-Dar Hospital - Medina
 Ohud Hospital - Medina
 Prince Mohammed bin Abdulazeez Hospital (NGHA) - Medina
 Al-Zahra Hospital - Medina

Tabuk

 North West Armed Forces Hospital - Tabuk
 King Fahad Specialist Hospital, Tabuk

Riyadh
 Al-Adwani General Hospital-Riyadh
 Image Dental Clinic] - Riyadh
 Abeer Medical Center - Riyadh
 Al Jazeera Hospital - Riyadh
 Prince Mohammad Bin Abdul Aziz Hospital - Riyadh
 King Salman Bin Abdulaziz Hospital - Riyadh
 King Saud Medical City - Riyadh
 Prince Sultan Military Medical City - Riyadh
 King Fahd Medical City - Riyadh
 King Faisal Specialist Hospital & Research Center - Riyadh
 King Abdulaziz Medical City - Riyadh
 King Khalid University Hospital - Riyadh
 King Abdulaziz University Hospital - Riyadh
 King Khalid Eye Specialist Hospital - Riyadh
 Security Forces Hospital - Riyadh
 Al Iman General Hospital - Riyadh
 Al Yamama Hospital - Riyadh
 Dallah Hospital - Riyadh
 Green Crescent Hospital - Riyadh
 Specialized Medical Center Hospital - Riyadh
 Saudi German Hospital - Riyadh
 Dr.Sulaiman Al-Habib Medical Complex in Olaya - Riyadh
 Dr.Sulaiman Al-Habib hospital in Arrayan - Riyadh
 Dr.Sulaiman Al-Habib hospital in Al Takhassusi - Riyadh
 Magrabi Eye, Ear & Dental Hospital - Riyadh
 Olaya Medical Center - Riyadh
 Obeid Specialized Hospital - Riyadh
Oxyhealth Clinics - Riyadh
 Kingdom Hospital - Riyadh
 Riyadh Care Hospital - Riyadh
 Riyadh Central Hospital - Riyadh
 Riyadh National Hospital - Riyadh
 Dr. Abanamy Hospital - Riyadh
 Al Hammadi Hospital] - Riyadh
 Al Mashary Hospital - Riyadh
 Al Mowasat Hospital - Riyadh
 Wadi ad-Dawasir Hospital - Wadi ad-Dawasir
 Armed forces Hospital - Wadi ad-Dawasir
 Jarir Medical Centre Riyadh (KMCR) - Riyadh
 Imam Abdul Rehman al Faisal Hospital - Riyadh
 AlOsrah International Hospital (OIH) - Riyadh
 Mouwasat Hospital - Riyadh
 Best Health Center for Home Medical Care-Riyadh

Jeddah

 Al-Adwani General Hospital  - Jeddah
 Abeer Medical Center - Jeddah
 Abuzinadah Hospital - Jeddah
 Abdul Latif Jameel Hospital - Jeddah
 Al-Amal Hospital (Ministry of Health) Drug Abuse Rehabilitation Facility - Jeddah
 Al-Hamra Hospital - Jeddah
 Al- Hayat Hospital - Jeddah
 Al-Jedaani Hospital - Jeddah
 Al-Magrebi Hospital - Jeddah 
 Al-Mostaqbal Hospital - Jeddah
 Al-Mousat Hospital - Jeddah
 Al-Salama Hospital - Jeddah
 Al-Thagher Hospital (Ministry of Health) - Jeddah
 King Fahd Armed forces Hospital - Jeddah
 Bugshan Hospital - Jeddah
 Dr. Bakhsh Hospital - Jeddah
 Dr. Daghistani Hospital - Jeddah
 Dr. Erfan & Bagedo General Hospital - Jeddah
 Dr. Ghassan N Pharaon General Hospital (GNP) - Jeddah
 Dr. Hassan A. Ghazzawi Hospital - Jeddah
 Dr. Khalid Idriss Hospital - Jeddah
 Dr. Suleiman Fakeeh Hospital - Jeddah
 Eye Hospital (Ministry of Health) - Jeddah
 Hai Al Jamea Hospital - Jeddah
 International Medical Center (IMC) - Jeddah
 Jeddah Clinic Hospital, Kandarah - Jeddah
 Jeddah National Hospital - Jeddah
 King Abdulaziz Hospital & Oncology Centre (Ministry of Health) - Jeddah
 King abdulaziz University Hospital - Jeddah
 King Abdullah Medical Complex - Jeddah
 King Fahad Hospital - Jeddah
 King Faisal Specialist Hospital - Jeddah
 Magrabi Hospitals and Centers
 Maternity & Children Hospital - Jeddah
 New Al-Jedaani Hospital - Jeddah
 Saudi American Hospital - Jeddah
 Saudi German Hospital - SGH Group - Jeddah
 Dr Hala Essa Binladin Hospital - Jeddah
 International Medical Center (IMC) - Jeddah
 AlMashfa Hospital - Jeddah
 Shifa Jeddah Polyclinic, Sharafiyya Jeddah

Eastern Province

 Nahj Alshifaa General Medical Complex - Khobar
 Nahj Alshifaa General Medical Complex - Safwa
 Pearl Clinics
 Arrawdah General Hospital 
 Clinic 9 Medical Center - Mohammediyah, Al Khaleej Road, Dammam.
 Abeer Medical Center - Dammam
 Almana General Hospital - Khobar
 Almana General Hospital - Dammam
 Healthcare Polyclinic - Dammam
 Almana General Hospital - Hofuf
Al Ahsa Hospital - Hofuf
Prince Saud Bin Jalawi Hospital - Hofuf
 Almana General Hospital - Jubail
 Al-Sadiq Hospital - Sayhat
 Al-Yousif Hospital - Khobar
 As-Salama Hospital - Khobar
 Badr Al Rabie Dispensary - Dammam
 Dar As Sihha Medical Center - Dammam
 Dammam Central Hospital - Dammam
 Dr. Fakhry and Al Rajhi Hospital - Khobar
 Erfan Hospital - Seyed Gholamreza fanaee
 Gama Hospital (Astoon) - Khobar
 Hussein Al-Ali Hospital - Hofuf
 Johns Hopkins Aramco Healthcare - Khobar
 Mouwasat Hospital - Qatif
 Mouwasat Hospital - Dammam
 Mouwasat Hospital - Khobar
 Mouwasat Hospital - Jubail
 King Fahad Specialist Hospital Dammam - Dammam 
 King Fahd University Hospital - Khobar
 King Fahd Military Medical Complex - Dhahran
 Mohammad Dossary Hospital (MDH) - Khobar
 Procare Riaya Hospital - Khobar
 Qatif Central Hospital – Qatif
 Al Bati Medical Center – Qatif
 Dar Afia Medical Center – Dammam
 Tadawi General Hospital
 Sigma Diagnostics - Dammam
 Dar Afia Medical Center Khobar – Khobar
 Dar Afia Medical Clinic Airport Branch – King Fahd International Airport

Al-Qassim Province
Al Fereh Hospital - Buraydah
 Qassim Armed Forces Hospital (QAFH) - Buraidah
 King Fahad Specialist Hospital - Buraidah
 Life Clinic - Buraidah
 Buraidah Central Hospital - Buraidah
 Buraidah Maternal and Children Hospital - Buraidah
 Bukayriyah General Hospital - Bukayriyah
 Buraidah Psychological Health Hospital - Buraidah
 Dr.Sulaiman Al Habib Hospital - Buraidah
 King Saud Hospital - Unaizah
 Al Wafaa Hospital - Unaizah
 Ar Rass General Hospital - Ar Rass
 Azzayed Hospital - Ar Rass
 Al Midhnab General Hospital - Al Midhnab
 Salamat Hospital - Ha'il
 Maternity And Children's Hospital (MCH) - Buraidah

Southern Region 
 King Fahad Hospital - Al Bahah
 Asir Central Hospital - Abha
 Abha General Hospital - Abha
 Abha private Hospital - Abha
 The Saudi German Hospital - Abha
 Al-Rahma Hospital - Abha
 Armed forces Hospital Southern Region - Khamis Mushait
 Al-Zafer Hospital - Najran
 Alwaseet Medical Complex. - Jizan City

Other regions
 Abeer Al Noor Medical center - Hail
 Al Hassan General Hospital - Ta'if
 Royal Commission Medical Center - Yanbu
 Dr. Sameer Ibrahim Saeedi General Hospital - Yanbu
 Yanbu National Hospital - Yanbu
 Yanbu General Hospital - Yanbu
 Al Ansari Specialist Hospital - Yanbu
 Taif Maternity Hospital - Ta'if
 Al Hada & Taif Military Hospitals - Ta'if
 King Faisal Hospital - Ta'if
 Dr. Noor Mohd Khan General Hospital - Hafar al-Batin
 King Abdul Aziz Specialist Hospital (KAASH) - Ta'if
 Al Adwani General hospital (AAGH) - Ta'if

References 

Saudi Arabia
 
Hospitals
Saudi Arabia